The 1934 West Tennessee State Teachers football team was an American football team that represented West Tennessee State Teachers College (now known as the University of Memphis) as a member of the Mississippi Valley Conference during the 1934 college football season. In their eleventh season under head coach Zach Curlin, West Tennessee State Teachers compiled a 3–3–2 record.

Schedule

References

West Tennessee State Teachers
Memphis Tigers football seasons
West Tennessee State Teachers football